The Olympus Zuiko Digital 35mm 1:3.5 Macro is an interchangeable macro lens for the Four Thirds system. It was announced by Olympus Corporation on September 26, 2005.

References

External links
 
specs

035mm f 3.5 Macro
Macro lenses
Camera lenses introduced in 2005